Astaneh-ye Ashrafiyeh (also Romanized as Āstāneh-ye Ashrafīyeh; also known as Astane and Āstāneh) is a city and capital of Astaneh-ye Ashrafiyeh County, Gilan Province, Iran.  At the 2006 census, its population was 36,298, in 10,558 families.

Astaneh-ye Ashrafiyeh is a major peanut, rice, silk, and fragrant medicinal herbs producing city. It lies close to the city of Rasht and the Caspian Sea. The mausoleum of Seyed Jalal od-Din Ashraf, brother of Imam Reza, as well as the tomb of Mohammad Moin, the Iranian lexicographer and compiler of Persian Dictionary, are located here.

The great Sepidrud river crosses the city on the northwest side. The main highway connecting the eastern and western parts of the province passes through Astaneh, over a c. 1-kilometre-long bridge. A satellite image of the city is found on google map. 
 entry in the Encyclopædia Iranica

References

Populated places in Astaneh-ye Ashrafiyeh County
Cities in Gilan Province